Charles Douglas Cary (born March 3, 1960) is a former professional baseball player who pitched in the Major Leagues from 1985 to 1991. He played for the Tokyo Giants in 1992, and returned to the Chicago White Sox in 1993. Cary was drafted in the seventh round of the 1981 Major League Baseball Draft out of the University of California Berkeley; where he was a member of the Chi Phi Fraternity and graduated in 1988. Cary pitched in the 1980 College World Series in Omaha, Nebraska, where he defeated the St. Johns Redmen. He was also slated for the win against University of Arizona two nights later, but received a no decision when the Bears lost in the ninth inning.

Cary was a reliever for the Detroit Tigers and Atlanta Braves until a 1988 knee injury cost him most of the season. He came back in 1989 with the New York Yankees. In New York, he spent most of his time in the starting rotation, posting a 4–4 record, with a 3.26 earned run average (ERA) in 1989, and making 27 starts in 1990 going 6–12, with a 4.19 ERA. After one more season with the Yankees, Cary finished his career with 16 relief outings for the White Sox in 1993.

References

External links

1960 births
Living people
Detroit Tigers players
Atlanta Braves players
New York Yankees players
Chicago White Sox players
Yomiuri Giants players
Major League Baseball pitchers
Baseball players from California
Macon Peaches players
Evansville Triplets players
Birmingham Barons players
Nashville Sounds players
Richmond Braves players
Gulf Coast Braves players
Columbus Clippers players
South Bend White Sox players
American expatriate baseball players in Japan
Sportspeople from Whittier, California
California Golden Bears baseball players